Claydon Brook is a  long river in Buckinghamshire, England that is a tributary of Padbury Brook, itself a tributary to the River Great Ouse. Claydon Brook itself has many tributaries, and is commonly used for fishing.

Course 
Both streams flow west for about  before conjoining in Swanbourne; from there, it resumes its westerly course into Winslow and through Granborough, where it receives the waters of Shipton Brook and later Claydon Brook Tributary before proceeding to flow north-west through Addington – where it then receives the waters from Horwood Tributary – and into Padbury, where it finally flows into Padbury Brook. It also flows through Bernwood Forest.

Human activity 
The river has several locations which can be used for fishing. Numerous bridges cross Claydon Brook, some dating back to the early modern period.

Water quality 
Water quality of Claydon Brook in 2019, according to the Environment Agency, a non-departmental public body sponsored by the UK's Department for Environment, Food and Rural Affairs. The agency splits the river into two separate catchments: the first half is 15.632 km, from its beginning to Winslow, and the second is 8.432 km, recorded from Granborough until the river's end into Padbury Brook.

References 

Rivers of Buckinghamshire